Linville is a Census-designated place located in Rockingham County, in the U.S. state of Virginia. It is located 6 miles north of Harrisonburg, Virginia. It is for the first time listed as CDP for the United States Census 2020. It contains the Linville United Church of Christ.

History
Linville Creek was one of the most important centers of Colonial Virginia during the eighteenth century.  Its name is derived from William Linvell (various spellings: Linvel, Linwell), who was granted 15,000 acres in the area prior to 1739.  Located along the Great Wagon Road in the Shenandoah Valley of Virginia, Linville quickly became a civilized outpost on the frontier. Its earliest settlers were English Quakers, and few Scotch-Irish who were later joined by Swiss Germans many of whom moved south from Pennsylvania.

Around 1750 Daniel Boone’s father Squire Boone moved his family from Oley, Pennsylvania to the Shenandoah Valley of Virginia. The Boone family farmed in the Linville Creek area for several years in the 1750s before moving on to North Carolina. On August 14, 1756, Daniel Boone married Rebecca Ann Bryan, daughter of Morgan Bryan of Linville Creek, whom he met while living in the Linville area. Boone’s wife and children stayed in the Linville area while he explored the wilderness west of the Allegheny Mountains.

President Abraham Lincoln's great-grandparents, "Virginia John" and Rebecca Flowers Lincoln also moved from Pennsylvania to Virginia in 1768 and settled on a 600-acre tract of land along Linville Creek. The President's father, Thomas Lincoln, was born on this property in 1778 before his family moved west to what is now Kentucky, which was then part of Virginia but across the mountains from the settled areas. The two-story brick home on the property known as the Lincoln Homestead and Cemetery was built circa 1800 by the President's great-uncle Jacob Lincoln.  The property, a registered Virginia Historic Landmark, includes a family cemetery where five generations of Lincolns are buried along with two slaves, identified as Queenie and Uncle Ned.

During the antebellum period, Linville was an important stop on the underground railroad due to the large number of Anabaptists in the area who were opposed to slavery and helped runaway slaves find safe passage out of Rockingham through Brock's Gap to Pendleton for a walk through Franklin and on to Petersburg in what is now West Virginia where they could find rail passage to the north.

Linville was affected by the major local floods of 1870. Its population at the time was 3547, with 17 "productive industries" in the town.

Mannheim and the George Chrisman House are listed on the National Register of Historic Places.

References

Unincorporated communities in Rockingham County, Virginia
Unincorporated communities in Virginia
Census-designated places in Rockingham County, Virginia
Census-designated places in Virginia